Nelson Lake may refer to:

Canada
Nelson Lake (Colchester), Nova Scotia
Nelson Lake (Halifax), Nova Scotia
Nelson Lake (Hants), Nova Scotia

United States
 Nelson Lake (Alaska)

 Nelson Lake (San Bernardino County), California
 Nelson Lake (Aitkin County, Minnesota)
 Nelson Lake (Douglas County, Minnesota)
 Nelson Lake, Goodhue County, Minnesota
 Nelson Lake (New York)
 Nelson Lake (Wisconsin)